The WOW! Awards is an organization which recognizes outstanding customer service based purely on customer nominations. It also holds an annual ceremony to recognize the “best of the best” organizations and employees.

Founded in 1997 by Derek Williams, The WOW! Awards are used by a wide variety of organizations in both the public and private sectors.  Users include utilities, local government, police forces, NHS hospitals, contact centers, financial services, housing associations, retail, manufacturing, and financial services.

The scheme is open to all customers and runs throughout the year for all companies. The WOW! Awards are licensed by various organizations for an annual fee, but unique nominations for any company can be made through The WOW! Awards official site. Nominations are judged and certificates presented for deserving nominations every month. The WOW! Awards is working with organizations in Australia and is trademarked in many territories worldwide.

References

External links 

 

Awards established in 1997